The Volumes (sometimes written as The Volume's) were an American R&B vocal group formed in 1960 in Detroit, Michigan, United States. The group's 1962 single for Chex Records, "I Love You", was a hit in the U.S., peaking at number 22 that year on the Billboard Hot 100. The tune was an amalgam of doo wop and Latin beats, and was co-written by bass Ernest Newson and the group's manager, Willie Ewing. The group recorded further singles for Chex and American Arts but never returned to the charts, remaining archetypical one-hit wonders.

Members
Ed Union
Elijah Davis
Larry Wright
Joe Travillion
Ernest Newson
Herb Hamlett
Clarence Berger Jr.

References

Jubilee Records artists
Musical groups from Detroit
American rhythm and blues musical groups